Alla (Dereen; Evenki: Олло, Ollo) is a rural locality (an ulus) in Kurumkansky District, Republic of Buryatia, Russia. The population was 1,080 as of 2010. There are 12 streets.

Geography 
Maysky is the nearest rural locality.

References 

Rural localities in Kurumkansky District